Conus julii is a species of sea snail, a marine gastropod mollusk in the family Conidae, the cone snails and their allies.

Like all species within the genus Conus, these snails are predatory and venomous. They are capable of "stinging" humans, therefore live ones should be handled carefully or not at all.

Description
The size of the shell varies between 32 mm and 62 mm. The shell is white. The upper part of body whorl, spire and interior are tinged with pink. The body whorl also shows longitudinal chestnut striations, forming two irregular bands.

Distribution
This species occurs in the Indian Ocean off Mauritius and the Mascarene Basin.

References

 Lienard, E., 1870. Description d'espèces nouvelles provenant de l'île Maurice. Journal de Conchyliologie 18: 304-305
 Lienard, E., 1871. Description d'espèces nouvelles provenant de l'île Maurice. Journal de Conchyliologie 19: 71-74
 Röckel, D., Korn, W. & Kohn, A.J., 1995. Manual of the living Conidae. Volume 1: Indo-Pacific region. Hemmen: 517 pp
 Tucker J.K. & Tenorio M.J. (2009) Systematic classification of Recent and fossil conoidean gastropods. Hackenheim: Conchbooks. 296 pp.
 Puillandre N., Duda T.F., Meyer C., Olivera B.M. & Bouchet P. (2015). One, four or 100 genera? A new classification of the cone snails. Journal of Molluscan Studies. 81: 1–23

External links
 The Conus Biodiversity website
 
 Syntype at MNHN, Paris

julii
Gastropods described in 1870